Festungsbahn may refer to:

 The Festungsbahn (Kufstein), a funicular railway in Kufstein, Austria 
 The Festungsbahn (Salzburg), a funicular railway in Salzburg, Austria